Augustine Nshimye is a Ugandan judge who has served as a member of the Supreme Court of Uganda since 2015.

Career
His career started in 1967 as a senior clerk. From 1986 until 1988, he served as deputy chief registrar. In 1988, he went into private practice.

In 2008, he was appointed a Justice of the Court of Appeal (which also serves as the Constitutional Court). In 2010, he temporarily served as an acting Justice of the Supreme Court. He was appointed to the Supreme Court in September 2015.

Between 1988 and 2008, he served as the member of parliament for Mityana South constituency. He also served as the cabinet minister for regional cooperation in the NRM government.

Other responsibilities
He is one of the founding members of the ruling National Resistance Movement political party. In 2015, he was appointed as the inspector of courts, a responsibility he serves concurrently with his role at the Supreme court.

See also
 Judiciary of Uganda
 Supreme Court of Uganda
 Cabinet of Uganda
 Parliament of Uganda

References

External links
 Provide bribe evidence against accused judicial officers - Judge

Living people
Year of birth missing (living people)
20th-century Ugandan judges
Ugandan judges
Members of the Parliament of Uganda
Makerere University alumni
Law Development Centre alumni
People from Western Region, Uganda
Justices of the Supreme Court of Uganda
21st-century Ugandan judges